Samuel Lewis (c. 1782 – 1865) was the editor and publisher of topographical dictionaries and maps of the United Kingdom of Great Britain and Ireland.  The aim of the texts was to give in 'a condensed form', a faithful and impartial description of each place. The firm of Samuel Lewis and Co. was based in London. Samuel Lewis the elder died in 1865. His son of the same name predeceased him in 1862.

A Topographical Dictionary of England 
This work contains every fact of importance tending to illustrate the local history of England. Arranged alphabetically by place (village, parish, town, etc.), it provides a faithful description of all English localities as they existed at the time of first publication (1831), showing exactly where a particular civil parish was located in relation to the nearest town or towns, the barony, county, and province in which it was situated, its principal landowners, the diocese in which it was situated, and—of novel importance—the Roman Catholic district in which the parish was located and the names of corresponding Catholic parishes. There were six subsequent editions, the last of which (1848-9) was in four volumes and an atlas.

A Topographical Dictionary of Wales 
First published in 1833, there was a second edition in 1837, a third in 1843, and a fourth (in two volumes and an atlas) in 1849.

The title page of the first edition gives an indication of the ambitious scope of the work:

The work is in two large volumes with a folding map of Wales and separate county maps facing the entry for each individual county.

The 4th edition was transcribed and made available free-to-view online by the University of London.

A Topographical Dictionary of Ireland 
First published in 1837 in two volumes, with an accompanying atlas, it marked a new and significantly higher standard in such accounts of Ireland. Apart from The Parliamentary Gazetteer of Ireland published in 1845, it has not been superseded. The first edition is available online. A second edition was published in 1842.

In the 1837 preface, the editor noted that:

Lewis relied on the information provided by local contributors and on the earlier works published such as Coote's Statistical Survey (1801), Taylor and Skinner's Maps of the Road of Ireland (1777), Pigot's Trade Directory (1824) and other sources. He also used the various parliamentary reports and in particular the census of 1831 and the education returns of the 1820s and early 1830s. Local contributors were given the proof sheets for final comment and revision. The names of places are those in use prior to the publication of the Ordnance Survey Atlas in 1838. Distances are in Irish miles (the statute mile is 0.62 of an Irish mile).

The dictionary gives a unique picture of Ireland before the Great Famine.

A Topographical Dictionary of Scotland 
First published in 1846 in two volumes and an atlas.

References

External links 
 A Topographical Dictionary of England seventh edition (1848)
 full text at British History Online
 Scanned volumes 1: A–C 2: D–K 3: L–R 4: S–Z at Internet Archive
 A Topographical Dictionary of Wales: fourth edition (1849), full text on British History Online.
 A Topographical Dictionary of Ireland: first edition (1837), full text on Library Ireland.
 A Topographical Dictionary of Scotland: first edition (1846), full text on British History Online.

English cartographers
1782 births
1865 deaths
19th-century English writers
Publishers (people) from London
19th-century British businesspeople